Group 4 of the UEFA Euro 1976 qualifying tournament was one of the eight groups to decide which teams would qualify for the UEFA Euro 1976 finals tournament. Group 4 consisted of four teams: Spain, Romania, Scotland, and Denmark, where they played against each other home-and-away in a round-robin format. The group winners were Spain, who finished two points above Romania and Scotland.

Final table

Matches

 (*)NOTE: Attendance also reported as 100,000

 (*)NOTE: Attendance also reported as 80,000

 (*)NOTE: Attendance also reported as 20,000

Goalscorers

References
 
 
 

Group 4
1974–75 in Spanish football
1975–76 in Spanish football
1974–75 in Romanian football
1975–76 in Romanian football
1974–75 in Scottish football
1975–76 in Scottish football
1974 in Danish football
1975 in Danish football